Doctor Who at the BBC Radiophonic Workshop Volume 4: Meglos & Full Circle is the final instalment in the Mark Ayres compiled series of releases of BBC Radiophonic Workshop music. It featured music, by Peter Howell and Paddy Kingsland, for the 1980 Doctor Who serials Meglos and Full Circle. It was the first full releases of both scores, although some sound effects from the serials appeared on the previous volume.

Track listing

Equipment
Equipment used on this compilation includes:
Yamaha CS-80
EMS Vocoder
Roland Jupiter-4
Roland CR-78
Oberheim OB-X
Yamaha SY-2

External links
Producer's press release
Album information

BBC Radiophonic Workshop albums
Doctor Who soundtracks
2002 compilation albums